In fluid dynamics, the capillary number (Ca) is a dimensionless quantity representing the relative effect of viscous drag forces versus surface tension forces acting across an interface between a liquid and a gas, or between two immiscible liquids. Alongside the Bond number, commonly denoted , this term is useful to describe the forces acting on a fluid front in  porous or granular media, such as soil. The capillary number is defined as:

Being a dimensionless quantity, the capillary number's value does not depend on the system of units.

For low capillary numbers (a rule of thumb says less than 10−5), flow in porous media is dominated by capillary forces, whereas for high capillary numbers the capillary forces are negligible compared to the viscous forces. Flow through the pores in an oil reservoir has capillary number values in the order of 10−6, whereas flow of oil through an oil well drill pipe has a capillary number in the order of unity.

The capillary number plays a role in the dynamics of capillary flow; in particular, it governs the dynamic contact angle of a flowing droplet at an interface.

Multiphase formulation 
Multiphase flows forms when two or more partially or immiscible fluids are brought in contact. The Capillary number in multiphase flow has the same definition as the single flow formulation, the ratio of viscous to surface forces but has the added(?) effect of the ratio of fluid viscosities:  

Multiphase microflows are characterized by the ratio of viscous to surface forces, the capillary number (Ca), and by the ratio of fluid viscosities:

See also
 Bond number
 Reynolds number
 Capillary pressure
 Froude number

References

Dimensionless numbers of fluid mechanics